Sk. Omar Ali was an Indian politician and Islamist belonging to All India Trinamool Congress. He was a legislator of West Bengal Legislative Assembly.

Ali served as a member of West Bengal Legislative Assembly from Panskura Paschim from 1971 to 1996. He joined Communist Party of India (Marxist) from Communist Party of India in 1997. Then, he was elected as a member of West Bengal Legislative Assembly from Nandanpur in 1998. Later, he changed his political party again and joined All India Trinamool Congress. He was elected as a member of West Bengal Legislative Assembly from Panskura Paschim in 2011. He died on 1 September 2015 at the age of 84.

References

2015 deaths
Trinamool Congress politicians from West Bengal
West Bengal MLAs 1971–1972
West Bengal MLAs 1972–1977
West Bengal MLAs 1977–1982
West Bengal MLAs 1982–1987
West Bengal MLAs 1987–1991
West Bengal MLAs 1991–1996
West Bengal MLAs 1996–2001
West Bengal MLAs 2011–2016
Communist Party of India (Marxist) politicians from West Bengal
Communist Party of India politicians from West Bengal
1930 births
Year of birth uncertain